Statistics of Úrvalsdeild in the 1959 season.

Overview
1959 was the 48th league championships in Iceland, six teams played and for the first time teams met both home and away. KR won the championship. KR's Þórólfur Beck was the top scorer with 11 goals.

League standings

Results
Each team played every opponent once home and away for a total of 10 matches.

References

Úrvalsdeild karla (football) seasons
Iceland
Iceland
Urvalsdeild